Anagoge (ἀναγωγή), sometimes spelled anagogy, is a Greek word suggesting a climb or ascent upwards.  The anagogical is a method of mystical or spiritual interpretation of statements or events, especially scriptural exegesis, that detects allusions to the afterlife.

Certain medieval theologians describe four methods of interpreting the scriptures: literal/historical, tropological, allegorical, and anagogical. Hugh of St. Victor, in De scripturis et scriptoribus sacris, distinguished anagoge, as a kind of allegory, from simple allegory. He differentiated in the following way: in a simple allegory, an invisible action is (simply) signified or represented by a visible action; Anagoge is that "reasoning upwards" (sursum ductio), when, from the visible, the invisible action is disclosed or revealed.

The four methods of interpretation point in four different directions: The literal/historical backwards to the past, the allegoric forwards to the future, the tropological downwards to the moral/human, and the anagogic upwards to the spiritual/heavenly.

In a letter to his patron Can Grande della Scala, the poet Dante explained that his Divine Comedy could be read both literally and allegorically; and that the allegorical meaning could be subdivided into the moral and the anagogical.

See also
 Allegorical interpretation of the Bible
 Biblical hermeneutics
 Historical-grammatical method
 Arcs of Descent and Ascent

References

Biblical exegesis